The Construction and Planning Agency of Minister of the Interior (CPAMI) is a government agency responsible for construction and building codes, urban planning, public housing, local infrastructure, land use and management in the Republic of China (Taiwan). The current Director General is Mr. Yeh Shih-Wen.

History
It was established on 2 March 1981 as an administrative agency of the Ministry of the Interior. On 1 July 1999 in a government reform, the agency was amalgamated with some offices from Taiwan Provincial Government.

Structure
The agency is grouped into the following divisions and offices.

Divisions
 Planning, Urban Planning
 Public Housing
 National Parks
 Building Administration
 Public Works 
 Building Engineering
 Road Engineering
 Environmental Engineering
 Construction
 Planning Administration
 Management Administration
 Land Administration
 Finance Administration

Offices
Secretariat 
Accounting
Civil Service Ethics
Personnel

Transportation
The CPAMI building is accessible South from Nanjing Fuxing Station of the Taipei Metro.

See also 
 Ministry of the Interior (Taiwan)

References 

1981 establishments in Taiwan
Executive Yuan
Government of Taiwan